Presley O'Bannon (1776 – September 12, 1850) was a first lieutenant in the United States Marine Corps, famous for his exploits in the First Barbary War (1801-1805). In recognition of his bravery, he was presented a sword for his part in attempting to restore Prince Hamet Karamanli to his throne as the Bey of Tripoli. This sword became the model for the Mameluke Sword, adopted in 1825 for Marine Corps officers, which is part of the formal uniform today.

Biography
Presley Neville O'Bannon was born in Fauquier County, Virginia, to William O'Bannon, a captain of the Continental Army in the American Revolutionary War (1775–1783), and Anne Neville, a sister of General John Neville, commander of Fort Pitt (formerly French Fort Duquesne, later Pittsburgh in western Pennsylvania) during the Revolution. O'Bannon was probably named after Neville's son Presley, who was aide-de-camp to the Marquis de Lafayette.

O'Bannon entered the Marine Corps on January 18, 1801. In the combined operations with the U.S. Navy, he led the successful attack at the Battle of Derna, a coastal town in eastern modern Libya on April 27, 1805, giving the Marines' Hymn its line "to the shores of Tripoli." Lieutenant O'Bannon became the first man to raise a United States flag over foreign soil in time of war; O'Bannon's superior, William Eaton (1764–1811), a former Army officer, had raised the American flag several months earlier while traveling on the Nile River from Alexandria to Cairo, but it had not been in a time of war. According to Marine Corps legend, Hamet Karamanli was so impressed with O'Bannon's bravery that he gave him a Mameluke sword as a gesture of respect.

O'Bannon resigned from the Marine Corps on March 6, 1807. He moved to Logan County, Kentucky, making his home in Russellville. He served in the Kentucky State Legislature in 1812, 1817, and 1820–21, and in the Kentucky State Senate from 1824 to 1826.

Some time before 1826, he married Matilda Heard, daughter of Major James Heard and Nancy Morgan, a daughter of American Revolutionary War general Daniel Morgan, commander at the Battle of Cowpens in South Carolina in 1781.

O'Bannon died in 1850 at age 74 in Pleasureville, Kentucky, where his daughter and nephew lived. In 1919, his remains were moved to the Frankfort Cemetery in Kentucky's state capital.

Mameluke sword
Because of O'Bannon's distinguished record during the Derna campaign, Marine Corps Commandant Archibald Henderson in 1825 adopted the Mameluke sword for wear by all Marine Corps commissioned officers. Since the initial distribution in 1826, the Mameluke sword has been worn except for the years 1859–1875, when regulations temporarily required Marine officers to wear the model U.S. Army M1850 foot officers' sword. Mameluke swords are worn by Marine Corps officers as prescribed with all uniforms except the evening dress and utility uniform.

Namesakes
Three Navy ships have been named USS O'Bannon in his honor: 

O'Bannon Hall, at the Basic School in Quantico, Virginia is named in honor of Presley O'Bannon.

See also

List of Historically Important U.S. Marines

Notes

References

Further reading
London, Joshua E. Victory in Tripoli: How America's How America's War with the Barbary Pirates Established the U.S. Navy and Shaped a Nation. New Jersey: John Wiley & Sons, Inc., 2005.
 Smethurst, David. Tripoli: The United States' First War on Terror. New York: Presidio Press, 2006.
 Hyperion, 2005. Was played by John Payne in the 1950 Paramount motion picture 'Tripoli'

External links

From the Halls of Montezuma To the Shores of Tripoli: Presley Neville O'Bannon and the Marine Corps Sword, at Virginia Memory

1776 births
1850 deaths
Burials at Frankfort Cemetery
People from Fauquier County, Virginia
United States Marine Corps officers
American military personnel of the First Barbary War
People from Russellville, Kentucky
Members of the Kentucky House of Representatives
Kentucky state senators
American people of Irish descent
American people of English descent